Taona is a genus of cicadas in the family Cicadidae. There are at least two described species in Taona.

Species
These two species belong to the genus Taona:
 Taona immaculata Chen, K.F., 1940 c g
 Taona versicolor Distant, 1909 c g
Data sources: i = ITIS, c = Catalogue of Life, g = GBIF, b = Bugguide.net

References

Further reading

 
 
 
 

Gaeanini
Cicadidae genera